John Senio (born 10 September 1982) is a Samoan rugby union footballer. He last played for French club FC Grenoble in the Pro D2. Prior to signing with Grenoble he played for Bourgoin ASM Clermont Auvergne, Edinburgh Rugby in the Celtic League and the New Zealand franchise the Blues in the Super 14. He has also played for the Samoan national team, and was a member of their 2003 Rugby World Cup squad. His brothers Kevin Senio and Dimitri Senio are also professional rugby players. He was a CS Bourgoin-Jallieu rugby player for the 2009/2010 season.

External links
 Edinburgh sign up Samoa's Senio
 John Senio on rwc2003.irb.com

1982 births
Living people
Samoan rugby union players
Blues (Super Rugby) players
ASM Clermont Auvergne players
Samoa international rugby union players
Samoan expatriate rugby union players
Expatriate rugby union players in New Zealand
Expatriate rugby union players in Scotland
Expatriate rugby union players in France
Samoan expatriate sportspeople in New Zealand
Samoan expatriate sportspeople in Scotland
Rugby union scrum-halves